Terrae Incognitae is a triannual peer-reviewed academic journal covering the history of cartography, geography, and exploration. It is published by the Society for the History of Discoveries.

External links
 

Geography journals
Cartography journals
History of science journals
Triannual journals
Publications established in 1969
English-language journals
Maritime history journals